Luis Aguilar Monsalve (born 7 October 1942) is an Ecuadorian writer, critic, and professor emeritus  at Hanover College in the United States.

Biography
Born in Cuenca, Ecuador, Aguilar Monsalve studied extensively in the United States, where received a BA from Loyola Marymount University, an MA from Claremont Graduate University, and MA and PhD degrees in Political Science and Latin American Literature from the University of California, Los Angeles. He was a lecturer in language, culture and literature at UCLA from 1982-1995.  He was also professor of Latin American literature and cultures at Hanover College from 2006 to 2016. From 2001 to 2006, he was visiting assistant professor and writer-in-residence at Wabash College; from 1995 to 2001 he was Professor of Latin American Literature, Political Science and International Relations at Universidad San Francisco de Quito.

Literary work
Aguilar Monsalve has published nineteen books of short-stories since 1986, some of them with several editions. He has also published one novel  with Editorial Verbum, two books of essays and one anthology of Ecuadorian short stories from the 21st century and one anthology of Ecuadorian flash fiction.

Awards and recognition
2013 The Daryl R. Karns Award for Scholarly and Creative Activity.
2012 Fray Vicente Solano Award for Outstanding Educator and Creative Writer
2012 Member of the Ecuadorian Academy of Language 
1996 Member of Group America

Selected works

Luis Aguilar Monsalve is included in the following anthologies: 

Literatura del Ecuador (cuatrocientos años) crítica y selecciones (2001) Antología Básica e Histórica del Cuento Ecuatoriano. Quito. Décima Primera Edición Actualizada (2004). 	
 El cuento ecuatoriano 1970-2010  (2012)
 Narrativa de Azuay y Cañar  (2012)
 Antología básica e historia del cuento ecuatoriano  (2016)
 Antología bilingüe del cuento ecuatoriano de inicios del siglo XXI (2017) 
 Cuentos migrantes  (2017)
 Antología del Microcuento Ecuatoriano (2019) Eskeletra editorial.
 Un autor, un relato (2021) Generis Publishing. 9 781639 023226 

 Books about Luis Aguilar Monsalve: 

 Luis Aguilar Monsalve: Acercamiento crítico a su narrativa (2016) Quito. Editorial Ecuador.

References

Living people
Hanover College faculty
Ecuadorian male short story writers
Ecuadorian short story writers
Ecuadorian male writers
Ecuadorian novelists
21st-century novelists
1942 births
Ecuadorian emigrants to the United States
People from Cuenca, Ecuador
Loyola Marymount University alumni
Claremont Graduate University alumni
University of California, Los Angeles alumni
Wabash College faculty
Academic staff of Universidad San Francisco de Quito
Male novelists
Ecuadorian academics
Ecuadorian critics
Ecuadorian essayists
21st-century short story writers
21st-century essayists
21st-century male writers